Emerge Television, or ETV, is a television broadcaster in Mongolia owned by Davaabayar Ch of IMerge Media LLC. It was founded in 2010.

It is also affiliated with Ikh Mongol FM 99.7.

History
It was founded in July 2010.

See also
Media of Mongolia
Communications in Mongolia

References

External links

Television companies of Mongolia
Television channels and stations established in 2010